A Little Bit of Bluff is a 1935 British comedy film directed by Maclean Rogers and starring Reginald Gardiner, Marjorie Shotter and Clifford Heatherley. The screenplay concerns a man who poses as a detective to recover some stolen jewels.

Cast
 Reginald Gardiner ... Hugh Rigby
 Marjorie Shotter ... Joyce Simcox
 H. F. Maltby ... Adm. Simcox
 Margaret Watson ... Mrs. Simcox
 Clifford Heatherley
 Clifford McLaglen
 Molly Fisher
 Peggy Novak

References

External links
 

1935 films
Films directed by Maclean Rogers
1935 comedy films
British comedy films
British black-and-white films
1930s English-language films
1930s British films